The Ministry of Foreign Affairs of the Republic of Kenya is the Kenyan government ministry which oversees the foreign relations of Kenya.

The Ministry was established in 1963 after Kenya's independence. Since independence, Kenyan foreign policy has been designed and guided by the principles of peaceful co-existence, preservation of national security, peaceful settlement of disputes, non-interference in the internal affairs of other states, non-alignment, national interest and adherence to the Charters of the United Nations and African Union.

A Service Charter, based on the current Strategic Plan and the Foreign Policy document, has been developed to guide the operations of the Foreign Ministry so that the Ministry could successfully implement its core mandate and functions. The Strategic Plan sets out what the Ministry is and what it does. The Ministry has developed a self-assessment mechanism, the Performance Contact, to facilitate delivery of services within predetermined targets.

See also 
List of Foreign Ministers of Kenya

References

External links
 Ministry of Foreign Affairs, Kenya

Foreign relations of Kenya

Kenya
Kenya
1963 establishments in Kenya